U-63 may refer to one of the following German submarines:

 , the lead ship of the Type U 63 class of submarines; launched in 1915 and that served in the First World War until surrendered on 16 January 1919; broken up at Blyth in 1922
 During the First World War, Germany also had these submarines with similar names:
 , a Type UB III submarine launched in 1917 and disappeared after 14 January 1918
 , a Type UC II submarine launched in 1917 and sunk on 1 November 1917
 , a Type IIC submarine that served in the Second World War until sunk 25 February 1940

Submarines of Germany